Alamarvdasht Rural District is a rural district (dehestan) in Alamarvdasht District, Lamerd County, Fars Province, Iran. At the 2006 census, its population was 5,154, in 1,049 families.  The rural district has 24 villages.

References 

Rural Districts of Fars Province
Lamerd County